Power to the People is the third book written by conservative radio show host Laura Ingraham. The book was published in 2007 by Regnery Publishing, and details Ingraham's views on the current political and cultural climate, including illegal immigration, the war against Islamofascism, the Supreme Court of the United States, the American education system, and the "pornification" of American culture. In the book, Ingraham describes how ordinary people can take charge and fight for traditional American values, she also presents examples of recent victories against amnesty for illegal immigrants and Verizon Wireless' sponsorship of Akon.

The book also details Ingraham's conversion to Catholicism and her battle with breast cancer.

2007 non-fiction books
Political books